The Drowning is a British four-part television thriller drama miniseries written and created by Francesca Brill and Luke Watson. It was first broadcast on Channel 5 on four consecutive nights from 1 February 2021. It stars Jill Halfpenny, Jonas Armstrong, Rupert Penry-Jones and Deborah Findlay.

Synopsis
Jodie is a woman with a struggling business and money problems. She has been trying to rebuild her life after the loss of her four year old son, Tom, from drowning. His body was never recovered. Ten years later, she glimpses a boy who looks just like an older version of her missing son. Faced with scepticism from her family and the police, she sets out to find the truth.

Cast

Jill Halfpenny as Jodie Walsh
Jonas Armstrong as Jason Walsh
Cody Molko as Daniel Tanner
Rupert Penry-Jones as Mark Tanner
Deborah Findlay as Lynn Walsh
Jade Anouka as Yasmin
Dara Devaney as Ben Gilmore
Babs Olusanmokun as Ade
Deirdre Mullins as Kate Gilmore

Production
The Drowning was filmed in and around Dublin, Ireland.

Episodes

Reception
Flora Carr reviewing on behalf of the Radio Times gave the first episode three stars out of five and described it as “A predictable yet gripping thriller about a grieving mother”, while Katie Rosseinsky reviewing on behalf of Evening Standard rated the first episode three stars out of five and acknowledged, “Jill Halfpenny is compelling as a grieving mother in this gripping thriller”. The Telegraph review by Anita Singh reported “Yes, it's not remotely credible but The Drowning is a no-nonsense thriller that keeps you guessing” and gave the first episode four out of five stars, the same rating as Lucy Mangan gave it in The Guardian.

The Drowning bypassed All Creatures Great and Small to become Channel 5's highest rated show since 1 September 2020. Using BARB's consolidated ratings for programmes watched live and on catch-up services (within 28 days), The Drowning is their most popular broadcast ever, with the episode on 1 February 2021 now getting 6.10 million viewers and the other three episodes getting more than 5 million viewers, per initial broadcast.

References

External links

2021 British television series debuts
2021 British television series endings
2020s British drama television series
2020s British television miniseries
British thriller television series
Channel 5 (British TV channel) original programming
English-language television shows